André Léon Alphonse Debry (15 June 1898 – 31 August 2005) was, at age 107, one of the last surviving French veterans of the First World War. He was later created an officer of the Legion d'Honneur, both for his war record, and for his work as principal of a school.

Debry was born in Rosières-en-Santerre (Somme). He was a soldier in the First World War. After the war, he met 
Marguerite, the woman he later married on 12 August 1924 in his home town.

In 2005, André and Marguerite Debry were able to celebrate their 81st wedding anniversary; this set a record for the longest marriage. They lived together in Argenton-sur-Creuse until his death, aged 107.  She died four months afterwards, aged 102.

References

1898 births
2005 deaths
French centenarians
Men centenarians
French military personnel of World War I
Officiers of the Légion d'honneur